Edmund Shea (August 15, 1942 – September 17, 2004) was an American photographer based in San Francisco.

Shea's work is featured on book covers, including works by Richard Brautigan and Hunter S. Thompson, and record album covers for music by Fleetwood Mac, Keith Jarrett, Herbie Hancock and Charles Lloyd.

Education and early work
Shea entered San Francisco State University as a writing student in the early 1960s, but his major changed to photography after his first year of college.

In addition to his own work, Shea worked as a printer of photographs for artists including Imogen Cunningham.

Projects and collaborations
 1973 Memorial Tribute to Diane ArbusAn exhibit at the De Saisset Museum that included three of Shea's works following the death of his friend Arbus
1975 Bruce Conner photograms
 1975 Media Burn by Ant FarmShea's uncredited photographs of the event became part of a traveling exhibit.A compilation of news clips about the event is presented by Mediaburn.org
 1983 The Maltese Falcon, by Dashiell Hammett Reissued by Arion Publishers and illustrated with Shea's contemporary photographs of actual streets and buildings featured in the 1929 novel.

Book covers
In Watermelon Sugar
The Pill Versus the Springhill Mine Disaster
Revenge of the Lawn
The Abortion: An Historical Romance 1966
Rommel Drives on Deep into Egypt

Lawsuit over Lenny Bruce photograph
Shea had been friends with comedian Lenny Bruce and had photographed Bruce on more than one occasion. One photograph taken in 1966 of Lenny and Kitty Bruce was used without attribution and without copyright notice by Fantasy Records on the album, Live at the Curran Theater, recorded in 1961 but not released until 1971. Shea discussed the violation with Fantasy representative Ralph J. Gleason in 1972, but he did not seek a copyright remedy in court until 2002. At that time Shea's claim was dismissed after a successful laches argument by Fantasy lawyers .

Shea died in 2004 from metastatic esophageal cancer.

See also
Maximum Darkness, album with interior photos
Future Games, album with interior photos

References

External links
Shea photo on Lenny Bruce poster
Shea composite photo of Bruce Conner and atom bomb explosion
 Oakland Museum of California collection

1942 births
2004 deaths
San Francisco State University alumni
American contemporary artists
Deaths from cancer in California
Rock music photographers
Photographers from California
American portrait photographers
Artists from San Francisco
Books with cover art by Edmund Shea
Writers from Cambridge, Massachusetts